Hassan Rabia Suwaidan Al-Hosni (born 1 February 1984), commonly known as Hassan Rabia, is an Omani footballer who plays for Al-Suwaiq Club in Oman Professional League.

Club career
Hassan started his career with Majees SC and stayed there till 2008. He then moved on loan to Oman First Division League side Al-Suwaiq Club where he made his breakthrough in football. After a successful 2009 Gulf Cup of Nations in which he was the top scorer of the tournament Rabia was signed by Saudi Arabian club Al-Nassr FC of the Saudi Professional League but after his one-year loan spell at the club he went back to Oman and signed for Al-Shabab Club. On 26 June 2012, he signed a contract with his former club Al-Suwaiq Club. On 30 September 2014, he signed a one-year contract extension with Al-Suwaiq Club.

Club career statistics

International career

Gulf Cup of Nations
Hassan has made appearances in the 2009 Gulf Cup of Nations and the 2010 Gulf Cup of Nations.

He first showed his talent during the 2003 Gulf Cup of Nations, scoring a hat-trick in a 4-0 win over Iraq and a goal in the semifinals in a 1-0 win over Qatar. Hassan was awarded the "Top Goal Scorer" award of the competition with a total of four goals. he helped his team to win their first ever Gulf Cup of Nations trophy. He scored one goal in the 2009 Gulf Cup of Nations in a 4-0 win over Iraq.

AFC Asian Cup Qualification
Hassan has made an appearance in the 2011 AFC Asian Cup qualification. In his only match, he scored a goal in a 1-0 win over Kuwait. Oman failed to qualify for the 2011 AFC Asian Cup.

FIFA World Cup Qualification
Hassan has made one appearance in the 2010 FIFA World Cup qualification and five appearances in the 2014 FIFA World Cup qualification.

National Team career statistics

Goals for Senior National Team
Scores and results list Oman's goal tally first.

Honours

Club
With Al-Suwaiq
Omani League (3): 2009-10, 2010–11, 2012–13
Sultan Qaboos Cup (1): 2013
Omani Super Cup (1): 2013; Runner-up 2011

References

External links
 
 
 Hassan Rabia at Goal.com
 
 

1984 births
Living people
Omani footballers
Oman international footballers
Majees SC players
Suwaiq Club players
Al Nassr FC players
Al-Shabab SC (Seeb) players
Saudi Professional League players
Oman Professional League players
Expatriate footballers in Saudi Arabia
Omani expatriate sportspeople in Saudi Arabia
Association football forwards
People from Muscat, Oman